James Slavin (born 18 January 1975 in Lanark) is a retired Scottish footballer who played as a central defender. He began his senior career with Celtic, having joining the club at youth level from Giffnock North. He made his debut against Dundee United in January 1995 and made two further first team appearances, both within the next week. He was transferred by Celtic to Partick Thistle in March 1996 for a £30,000 fee, where he went on to make 26 Scottish Football League appearances. He left Partick in 1998 and was briefly with Ross County without appearing for their first team. He subsequently played in junior football with Wishaw Juniors.

References

Living people
1975 births
Sportspeople from Lanark
Scottish footballers
Association football central defenders
Celtic F.C. players
Partick Thistle F.C. players
Ross County F.C. players
Wishaw Juniors F.C. players
Scottish Football League players
Scottish Junior Football Association players
Footballers from South Lanarkshire